Werewolves and Lollipops is Patton Oswalt's second comedy album, following Feelin' Kinda Patton.  It was recorded in Austin, Texas and released on July 10, 2007. The album also features a bonus DVD featuring an additional performance at the 40 Watt Club in Athens, Georgia.

The track "America Has Spoken" appears on the Sub Pop Records Facebook Sampler released on iTunes.

A limited release vinyl edition of five hundred copies was released by Stand Up! Records, in association with Sub Pop, in April 2010.  The LP contained the bonus DVD as well as a free download code for the LP contents.

Reception 

The album garnered generally positive praise upon its release. Almost Cool Music Review called Oswalt "One of the funnier comics working today." The Orange County weekly said of the album: "So gratifying and unhackneyed are Oswalt’s scathing riffs that by disc’s end, you want to buy him a bottle of wine that’s beyond your price range." Stylus Magazine gave the album a B+, saying, " ... Werewolves is a classic comedy album in that it captures a seasoned comedian at his prime, spectacularly displaying his trademarks while proving himself able to bring in audiences skeptical of his cynicism." Pitchfork also referred to this as Oswalt's magnum opus.

Track listing
"Here We Go" – 0:33
"America Has Spoken" – 3:26
"Beautiful People and a Bridge Troll" – 3:06
"Clean Filth" – 1:57
"The Miracle of Childbirth" – 2:39
"You Are Allowed 20 Birthday Parties" – 5:38
"The Dukes of Hazzard" – 2:11
"Alternate Earth" – 1:11
"Best Week Never" – 1:50
"Physics for Poets" – 4:05
"At Midnight I Will Kill George Lucas with a Shovel" – 4:35
"Bubble of Sanity" – 1:06
"Sterling, Virginia" – 1:19
"The Gatekeepers of Coolness" – 3:08
"Racist Cell Phones" – 1:40
"The Best Baby in the Universe" – 2:00
"Married & Single" – 0:16
"I Tell a Story About Birth Control and Deal with a Retarded Heckler" – 5:57
"Great Food Is Cooked by Psychos" – 2:34
"Wackity Schmackity Doo!" – 2:15
"Death Bed" – 3:47
"Cirque du Soleil" – 2:57

Personnel
Patton Oswalt – Performer
Henry Owings – Production, Editing
Randall Squires – Recording
Dave Barbe – Mixing
Jeff Capurso – Editing, Mastering, DVD Audio Mastering
Adam Wingard – DVD Editing, Filming
Kyle McKinnon – Filming
Chris Hileke – Filming
Curt Wells – Live Audio
Ben Holst – DVD Audio Mixing
Zeloot – Illustrations
Ryan Russel – Photography
Jeff Kleinsmith – Design

References

Patton Oswalt albums
2007 live albums
Sub Pop live albums